The Verkehrsverbund Rhein-Neckar (VRN) is a transport association covering parts of the German states of Baden-Württemberg, Rhineland-Palatinate and Hesse in south-west Germany. Founded in 1989, it initially served the Rhein Neckar Area, but has since grown beyond its borders to cover an oblong area of 10,000 km2 with a population of 3 million, including Mannheim and Ludwigshafen, Heidelberg, Kaiserslautern, the entire Palatinate Forest and the northernmost parts of Baden-Württemberg. VRN tickets can also be used for journeys to and from several neighbouring areas, including the French town of Wissembourg.

The VRN is owned by the three states, cities and rural districts whose area it serves. The public transport companies that operate the network are organized in a second company, Unternehmensgesellschaft Verkehrsverbund Rhein-Neckar GmbH (URN). URN member DB Regio operates standard gauge rail transport in the area; other URN members operate buses and trams. This includes the largest German metre gauge rail network, which connects Bad Dürkheim, Mannheim, Ludwigshafen, Heidelberg and Weinheim.

See also
 Rhein-Neckar-Verkehr

External links
 Verkehrsverbund Rhein-Neckar – official website

Transport associations in Baden Württemberg
Public transport in Germany
Transport in Baden-Württemberg
Transport in Rhineland-Palatinate
Transport in Hesse
Companies based in Mannheim
Transport in Mannheim
1989 establishments in West Germany
Companies established in 1989
Südliche Weinstraße